Pittosporum coriaceum is a species of plant in the Pittosporaceae family. It is endemic to Macaronesia, and due to extinction in the Canary Islands, it is now restricted to the Portuguese Madeira Islands.

Pittosporum coriaceum is a Critically endangered species due to habitat loss.

References

coriaceum
Flora of Madeira
Critically endangered plants
Taxonomy articles created by Polbot